Yulisa López (born 10 September 1993) is a Guatemalan rower. She competed in the women's lightweight double sculls event at the 2020 Summer Olympics. She also won four medals, including two golds, at the 2017 Central American Games.

References

External links
 

1993 births
Living people
Guatemalan female rowers
Olympic rowers of Guatemala
Rowers at the 2020 Summer Olympics
Pan American Games competitors for Guatemala
Rowers at the 2019 Pan American Games
People from Puerto Barrios
Central American and Caribbean Games bronze medalists for Guatemala
Central American and Caribbean Games medalists in rowing
Competitors at the 2018 Central American and Caribbean Games